
In mathematics the finite Fourier transform may refer to either

another name for discrete-time Fourier transform (DTFT) of a finite-length series.  E.g., F.J.Harris (pp. 52–53) describes the finite Fourier transform as a "continuous periodic function" and the discrete Fourier transform (DFT) as "a set of samples of the finite Fourier transform".  In actual implementation, that is not two separate steps; the DFT replaces the DTFT.  So J.Cooley (pp. 77–78) describes the implementation as  discrete finite Fourier transform.

or

 another name for the Fourier series coefficients.

or

 another name for one snapshot of a short-time Fourier transform.

See also
 Fourier transform

Notes

References

Further reading
Rabiner, Lawrence R.; Gold, Bernard (1975). Theory and application of digital signal processing. Englewood Cliffs, N.J.: Prentice-Hall. pp 65–67. .

Transforms
Fourier analysis
Fourier series